Home Town Story is a 1951 American drama film written and directed by Arthur Pierson, starring Jeffrey Lynn, Donald Crisp, and Marjorie Reynolds, with Marilyn Monroe and Alan Hale Jr.

Plot
A defeated politician, Blake Washburn, takes over as editor of a small town newspaper in an effort to get himself re-elected. His campaign is intended to be a continuing exposé of the evils of big industry, and his strategy is to publish daily screeds against enormous corporate profits that enrich shareholders.

On a school outing to an abandoned mine, Washburn's little sister is trapped in the collapse of a mine tunnel caused as the result of a disgruntled employee's negligence, and the town's industries come to her rescue. The sister is rescued and flown in a company plane to the big city, and Washburn has a change of heart and recognizes that big corporations are necessary because, "It takes bigness to do big things", a line in the film delivered by MacFarland, the maker of the medical device that saved the sister.

Cast

Reception
According to MGM records, the film grossed $243,000 in the United States and Canada and $91,000 elsewhere, making a profit of $195,000.

References

External links
 
 
 
 
 

1951 films
1951 drama films
1950s American films
1950s English-language films
American black-and-white films
American drama films
Films directed by Arthur Pierson
Metro-Goldwyn-Mayer films